Numerous critical and industry groups have acclaimed Everything Everywhere All at Once, a 2022 American absurdist comedy-drama film written and directed by Daniel Kwan and Daniel Scheinert (collectively known as "Daniels"), who co-produced it with Anthony and Joe Russo. It is currently "the most awarded film of all time." 

Everything Everywhere All at Once received a leading 11 nominations at the 95th Academy Awards, more than any other film, and won a leading seven awards, including Best Picture. Several of its nominations made Oscar history: Michelle Yeoh became the first Asian woman nominated in the Best Actress category, while Stephanie Hsu's nomination in the Best Supporting Actress category, alongside Hong Chau's nomination for The Whale, marked the first time two Asian actresses were nominated in that category in the same year. The film won Best Picture, Best Director, Best Actress for Yeoh, Best Supporting Actor for Ke Huy Quan, Best Supporting Actress for Jamie Lee Curtis, Best Original Screenplay, and Best Film Editing, becoming the first film to win six above-the-line Oscars. It was the third film to win three acting Oscars (after A Streetcar Named Desire (1951) and Network (1976)), and the first to also win Best Picture.

The National Board of Review and the American Film Institute both named it one of the top ten films of 2022. Yeoh and Quan received awards for their performances at the 80th Golden Globes. Quan also won Best Supporting Actor at the 28th Critics' Choice Awards.

Accolades

Notes

References

External links 
 

Lists of accolades by film